The Philips P2000T home computer was Philips' first real entry in the home computer market in 1980, after the Philips Videopac G7000 game system (better known in North America as the Magnavox Odyssey2) which they already sold to compete with the Atari 2600 and similar game systems. There was also a P2000M version with an additional 80-column text card for use with a monochrome monitor. This version shipped with a monitor cabinet also housing a dual 5.25" floppy drive. The P2000C version, introduced in 1982, was portable.

The P2000 systems can be emulated with the MESS software, and since 2015 they are part of MAME. Other emulators also exist.

P2000T 
The P2000T was a Z80-based home computer that used a Mullard SAA5050 teletext display chip to produce the video picture and a small Mini-Cassette recorder for 42 kilobytes of mass storage capacity. The Mini-Cassette was treated as a floppy drive from the user's perspective while using the automatic search for a program (CLOAD command) or free space (CSAVE ). A command to display the directory of the cassette also exists.

Philips used components they already produced for other markets (television sets and dictation machines) to quickly design a small computer system. It was partially designed by Austrian professor Dieter Hammer. They also copied the ROM cartridge system from their Videopac G7000 game system. One of these cartridges contained Microsoft BASIC. It was also possible to use cassette tape floppies.

Although the teletext video chip permitted a quick entry into the home computer market, it was also the major weakness of the P2000T. Using the teletext standard in itself was not a bad idea because it did support eight colors and rudimentary graphics. But unlike later entries in the home computer market also supporting a teletext display mode, such as the venerable BBC computer and the Oric Atmos, the P2000T did not support a high resolution display mode. This made it very difficult to develop interesting games for it, with only a few titles being released.

As a result, the P2000T had only limited success, and Philips later replaced it with their MSX machines. The machine did gain popularity in Netherlands, especially in the areas of science, education, and data communications (videotex).

Initially, in 1981, the computer cost 3000 guilders (€2725 in 2015's money). In 1984 the price was lowered to 1200 guilders (€967 in 2015's money).

P2000M 
The P2000M incorporated two 5,25-inch floppy disk drives, besides a built-in monochrome screen. It could run CP/M or Microsoft BASIC applications, depending on the cartridge used.  It was incompatible with the P2000T due to the way it handled display of special characters (color, "graphics mode"), which made most P2000T games unplayable.

References

External links
 P2000 architecture

Philips products
Z80-based home computers
Home computers